Dyschirius apicius is a species of ground beetle in the subfamily Scaritinae. It was described by Johannes von Nepomuk Franz Xaver Gistel in 1857.

References

apicius
Beetles described in 1857